Wildan Delta known as Kiwil (born August 10, 1972) is an Indonesian actor and comedian of Minangkabau descent. His first film appearance was in the horror film Tiren: Mati Kemaren in 2008.

Career
Kiwil began his career as a stand-up comedian and film actor in Indonesia. He has since appeared in the films Tulalit, Paku Kuntilanak, Setan Budeg, and Nenek Gayung. Kiwil also become one of the cast of the Indonesian comedy show Yuk Keep Smile.

Personal life
Wildan Delta was born on August 10, 1972, in Jakarta. Kiwil married his first wife, Rochimah, on February 28, 1998, and they have four sons. His second wife is Meggy Wulandari.

Filmography

Film

Television

References

External links
  Berita Kiwil
 Facebook Kiwil (Hoho)
 Twitter Kiwil

1972 births
People from Jakarta
Indonesian male comedians
Indonesian comedians
Living people